Claude Lajeunesse (born 1941) is a Canadian who is the president and chief executive officer of the Aerospace Industries Association of Canada, appointed to that post on Nov. 30, 2007.

He is the former president and vice-chancellor of Concordia University.

Career
Claude Lajeunesse was born in Quebec City, received a Master of Science degree in 1967 in Nuclear Engineering and a PhD in 1969. He is  a member of the boards of TD Meloche Monnex, Atomic Energy of Canada Limited, the Montreal Board of Trade, and the Canadian Liver Foundation, a Fellow of the Canadian Academy of Engineering, and a member of the Ordre des ingénieurs du Québec.

From 1995 until August 2005, Lajeunesse was president and vice chancellor of Ryerson University. Prior to his appointment as president of Ryerson University, he was CEO of the Association of Universities and Colleges of Canada.  He was appointed to serve a 5-year term as the president and vice-chancellor of Concordia University in Montreal beginning August 1, 2005; however, due to conflicts with the Concordia board of governors he left that post on October 31, 2007.

Criticism and public perception
Lajeunesse has been criticized for "corporatization" of the universities he has headed by emphasizing part-time labor, raising tuition fees, and union busting.

At both Ryerson and Concordia, Lajeunesse made the controversial first step of giving himself a 50% pay raise, and increases of 20-50% for his immediate entourage. Lajeunesse defended his actions stating that the pay increase brought parity with other universities in Canada. Unions were critical of the move, however, as their membership had gone without wage increases for 5 years and the university's offer of a 2.5% increase did not address parity or even the cost of living increase. Union members were also required to give up job security while Lajeunesse and the administration retained theirs.

References

 
 
 Concordia News : Claude Lajeunesse appointed President of Concordia University (2005)
 Concordia News : Claude Lajeunesse steps down as President of Concordia University (2007)
 The Eye Opener (Ryerson University): Bye, Claude. You won't be missed (2007)
 The Eye Opener (Ryerson University): Ex-Rye head resigns from Concordia (2007)
 The Link (Concordia University): Concordia university president resigns (2007)
 The Link (Concordia University): Faculties demand answers about Concordia president’s resignation (2007)
 Macleans's : Leaving Concordia (2007)

Citations

External links
Claude Lajeunesse Biography

Living people
Presidents of Toronto Metropolitan University
Presidents of Concordia University
1941 births
People from Quebec City
Fellows of the Engineering Institute of Canada
Canadian university and college chief executives